No. 422 Squadron RCAF was a unit of the Royal Canadian Air Force, formed during World War II.

422 General Reconnaissance Squadron formed at RAF Castle Archdale near Lough Erne, Northern Ireland, in April 1942. It was a flying-boat squadron, flying  Cansos and Short Sunderlands to patrol the North Atlantic for German U-boats. They were redesignated a Transport Squadron in June 1945, and disbanded in September 1945.

The squadron was reformed at RCAF Station Uplands in January 1953 as 422 Fighter Squadron. The squadron went to 4 Wing RCAF Station Baden-Soellingen in August 1953, becoming part of the Canadian Armed Forces in 1968. Becoming 422 Fighter Squadron, CAF, it remaining there until deactivation in July 1970.

The squadron was reactivated as 422 Tactical Helicopter Squadron in January 1971, and remained a helicopter squadron until it was disbanded in August 1980.

Aircraft
422 General Reconnaissance Squadron
Saro Lerwick
 Consolidated Canso
Short Sunderland
Douglas Dakota
Consolidated Liberator
422 Fighter Squadron
de Havilland Vampire
Canadair F-86 Sabre
Canadair CF-104 Starfighter
422 Tactical Helicopter Squadron
Bell CH-135 Twin Huey
Bell CH-136 Kiowa

References

Canadian Article XV squadrons of World War II
Royal Canadian Air Force squadrons
Military units and formations disestablished in 1968